Marion County is a county located in the U.S. state of Illinois. According to the 2010 census, it had a population of 39,437. Its county seat is Salem.

Marion County comprises the Centralia, IL Micropolitan Statistical Area, which is included in the St. Louis-St. Charles-Farmington, MO-IL Combined Statistical Area.

History 
Marion County was organized on 24 January 1823 from portions of Jefferson and Fayette counties. It was named in honor of Revolutionary War Gen. Francis Marion, the "Swamp Fox".

Geography

The southwest corner of Marion County is the intersection of the Baseline with the Third Principal Meridian, the point of origin for the third survey of the Northwest Territory under the Land Ordinance of 1785. The origin is marked with a boulder south of Centralia just off U.S. 51.

Climate and weather

Major highways
  Interstate 57
  U.S. Route 50
  U.S. Route 51
  Illinois Route 37
  Illinois Route 161

Adjacent counties
 Fayette County - north
 Clay County - east
 Wayne County - southeast
 Jefferson County - south
 Washington County - southwest
 Clinton County - west

Demographics

As of the 2010 United States Census, there were 39,437 people, 16,148 households, and 10,746 families residing in the county. The racial makeup of the county was 93.1% white, 3.9% black or African American, 0.6% Asian, 0.3% American Indian, 0.4% from other races, and 1.6% from two or more races. Those of Hispanic or Latino origin made up 1.4% of the population. In terms of ancestry, 27.5% were German, 15.8% were Irish, 13.6% were English, and 10.8% were American.

Of the 16,148 households, 30.9% had children under the age of 18 living with them, 48.9% were married couples living together, 12.8% had a female householder with no husband present, 33.5% were non-families, and 28.8% of all households were made up of individuals. The average household size was 2.40 and the average family size was 2.91. The median age was 41.4 years.

The median income for a household in the county was $38,974 and the median income for a family was $50,518. Males had a median income of $41,428 versus $28,042 for females. The per capita income for the county was $20,493. About 12.2% of families and 16.5% of the population were below the poverty line, including 23.9% of those under age 18 and 9.6% of those age 65 or over.

Communities

Cities
 Centralia
 Kinmundy
 Salem
 Wamac

Villages

 Alma
 Central City
 Iuka
 Junction City
 Kell
 Odin
 Patoka
 Sandoval
 Vernon
 Walnut Hill

Townships
Marion County is divided into seventeen townships:

 Alma
 Carrigan
 Centralia
 Foster
 Haines
 Iuka
 Kinmundy
 Meacham
 Odin
 Omega
 Patoka
 Raccoon
 Romine
 Salem
 Sandoval
 Stevenson
 Tonti

Unincorporated Communities

 Greendale
 Tonti

Politics
Initially a strongly Democratic anti-Yankee county, Marion County has undergone two transitions. Between 1912 and 2004 it was a perfect bellwether apart from the Catholicism-influenced 1960 election when substantial anti-Catholic voting by its largely southern white population caused it to support Republican Richard Nixon. Since the beginning of the twenty-first century it has voted consistently for Republican presidential candidates.

See also
 National Register of Historic Places listings in Marion County, Illinois

References

 
Illinois counties
1823 establishments in Illinois
Populated places established in 1823
Marion County, Illinois